Huang Haiyang (born 1985-11-01 in Xuzhou, Jiangsu) is a female Chinese sabre fencer. She competed at the 2008 Summer Olympics.

Major performances
2002 Asian Games - 1st team;
2003 World Championships - 2nd team;
2004 World Cup Grand Prix - 2nd team

See also
China at the 2008 Summer Olympics

External links
Huang Haiyang's profile

1985 births
Living people
Chinese female fencers
Fencers at the 2008 Summer Olympics
Olympic fencers of China
Olympic silver medalists for China
Sportspeople from Xuzhou
Olympic medalists in fencing
Medalists at the 2008 Summer Olympics
Asian Games medalists in fencing
Fencers at the 2002 Asian Games
Fencers at the 2006 Asian Games
Asian Games gold medalists for China
Medalists at the 2002 Asian Games
Medalists at the 2006 Asian Games
Fencers from Jiangsu
21st-century Chinese women